Papyrus Oxyrhynchus 154 (P. Oxy. 154 or P. Oxy. I 154) is an account listing various payments, written in Greek and discovered in Oxyrhynchus. The manuscript was written on papyrus in the form of a sheet. The document was written in the late 6th century. Currently it is housed in the Egyptian Museum (10102) in Cairo.

Description 
The recto side of this papyrus contains a list of payments of wine, oil, meat, etc., to various people. The verso contains a list of receipts and payments, partly in wheat and partly in money. The accounts on the verso side are of particular interest because of their comparisons between the relative values of different types of solidi. The measurements of the fragment are 300 by 545 mm.

It was discovered by Grenfell and Hunt in 1897 in Oxyrhynchus. The text was published by Grenfell and Hunt in 1898.

Excerpt from verso side
Given to Andronicus the sailor 70 artabae, and to Anoup and John, lawyers (?) and contractors of the racecourse, as payment for the 11th indiction, 60 artabae of wheat, remainder  artabae, 1 choenix of wheat. This, at 1 solidus less 4 carats on the private standard for every 10 artabae, is equivalent to  solidi less 193 carats on the private standard, that is, less  carats or  solidi on the public standard, making  pure solidi on the public standard, which are equivalent to  solidi on the Alexandrian standard.

To the banker  solidi on the Alexandrian standard, also 1 solidus less 4 carats on the private standard, which is equivalent to  solidus on the standard of Alexandria, total  solidi on the Alexandrian standard, leaving  solidi on the Alexandrian standard.

See also 
 Oxyrhynchus Papyri
 Papyrus Oxyrhynchus 144
 Papyrus Oxyrhynchus 153
 Papyrus Oxyrhynchus 155
 Papyrus Oxyrhynchus 2024

References 

154
6th-century manuscripts
Byzantine manuscripts
Egyptian Museum